The 2017 Armenian Cup Final was the 26th Armenian Cup Final, and the final match of the 2016–17 Armenian Cup. It was played at the Republican Stadium in Yerevan, Armenia, on 24 May 2017, and was contested by Shirak and Pyunik. 

It was Pyunik's twelfth Cup final appearance, first since defeating Mika in 2015, and Shirak's seventh and first since losing to Pyunik in 2013. Shirak ran out 3-0 winners over Pyunik, thanks to two goals from Kyrian Nwabueze and one from Vahan Bichakhchyan.

Match

Details

References

Armenian Cup Finals
Cup Final